Clinidium is a genus of wrinkled bark beetles in the subfamily Rhysodinae. Most species are Neotropical, but some occur further north in North America and there is also one species in Europe (Clinidium canaliculatum) and one in Japan. Two species are known from Miocene amber.

There are five subgenera:

Species
The genus contains the following species:

References

 
Carabidae genera
Taxa named by William Kirby (entomologist)